The New Ireland boobook (Ninox variegata) also known as the Bismarck hawk-owl or  Bismarck boobook, is a small to medium-sized owl measuring  in length. It is a dark rufous-brown above, with barred scapular feathers and variable amounts of spotting or barring on the wings and tail. Its underparts are whitish, with an unmarked pale throat, a dark barred upper breast and barring on the remainder of the underparts.  Its face is dark brown, its eyes are brown or yellow, and its bill and legs are yellow. It is short-tailed and has heavy tarsi (the part of the leg above what is commonly referred to as the foot).

It was first described as Noctua variegata by French naturalists Jean René Constant Quoy and Joseph Paul Gaimard in 1830.

Although its population size has not been quantified, it is widespread and fairly common in forest and forest edges within its range, and its numbers are thought to be stable.  Deforestation is thought to be a likely threat to the species.

References

New Ireland boobook
Birds of New Ireland Province
New Ireland boobook
Taxa named by Jean René Constant Quoy
Taxa named by Joseph Paul Gaimard